The women's marathon event at the 1999 All-Africa Games was held in the streets of Johannesburg on 19 September 1999.

Results

External links 

 Results at the website of Todor Krastev
 South African and Ethiopian marathon domination, article by Mark Ouma for the IAAF, 19 September 1999

Athletics at the 1999 All-Africa Games
1999 Women